Kerend-e Gharb (also known as Kerend, Karand, and Karīnd) is a city and capital of Dalahu County, Kermanshah Province, Iran.  At the 2006 census, its population was 7,894, in 2,041 families.

The city is populated by Kurds and is important in the Yarsani religion as it is the location of the tombs of the holy men Pir Benjamin and Pir Musi.

Language 
Language distribution in the city:

See also

References

Cities in Kermanshah Province
Kurdish settlements in Kermanshah Province
Populated places in Dalahu County
Yarsan holy places